Judith Pallarés i Cortés (born 5 August 1972), is an Andorran politician, since 22 May 2019 Minister of Civil Service and Reform of the Administration in the government of Xavier Espot.

She was born in the Catalan city of Barcelona on 5 August 1972 and studied Political and Administration Science in the University of Barcelona. Is member of the Liberal Party of Andorra since 2001. Between 2003 and 2007 was city councillor of La Massana and got a seat in the General Council in the 2015 Andorran parliamentary election, but she didn't revalidated it in the 2019 election.

She was also a member of the Andorran delegation to the Parliamentary Assembly of the Council of Europe from 2015 until January 2018.

References

1972 births
Living people
Andorran women in politics
Women government ministers of Andorra
Liberal Party of Andorra politicians
Politicians from Barcelona
Members of the General Council (Andorra)
Members of the Parliamentary Assembly of the Council of Europe
University of Barcelona alumni
Spanish emigrants to Andorra
Andorran people of Spanish descent
Andorran people of Catalan descent
21st-century Spanish women politicians